Happy Ghost (released in the Philippines as Magic to Win 3: The Origin) is a 1984 Hong Kong comedy film directed by Clifton Ko. Produced and written by Raymond Wong, the film stars Wong, Boonie Law, Loletta Lee and Sandy Lamb. The film was the 12th most grossed films in Hong Kong of 1984.

Plot 
The film is about three high school students, Bonnie (Bonnie Law), Juilet (Rachel Lee (actress)) and Venus (Sandy Lamb), in their last year in school together, go on their last picnic before their examinations. Taking shelter from a sudden storm in an abandoned temple, Bonnie finds a piece of rope and takes it home. With this rope she brings home a spirit of Scholar Pik (Raymond Wong Pak-ming), whose archaic ways of thinking obviously clashed with the values held by a twentieth century teenager. Yet, they began to make friends with each other. The three girls started to depend on Scholar Pik's magic for everything. After their exam, they realize it, the girls begin to derive a more positive and hardworking attitude towards life through his encouragement.

Cast
Raymond Wong Pak-ming as Stewart Pik (朱錦春) - The Happy Ghost 
Bonnie Law as Bonnie Lam (林菁菁) - Naughty and playful, also an athlete
Loletta Lee as Juliet (林小花) - Married to Joseph, has a son
Sandy Lamb as Venus Koo (顏如玉) - Bookworm
Teresa Carpio as Sister Lee (李主任) - Nun
Hsiao-kang Wu as Joseph (陳世美) - Married to Juliet, has a son
Luisa Maria Leitão as Judy - Daughter of a rich family, Juliet's rival in love
Brenda Lo as Twiggy (八妹姐) - School dormitory worker, Fatty's wife
Kai-Keung Sze as Fatty (肥叔叔) - School dormitory worker, Twiggy's husband, reads Playboy all the time
Gou Wang as Mr. Koo (顏先生) - Koo's father
Suen Lai as Mrs. Koo (顏太太) - Koo's mother
Yu Chan-Kau as Brazano Trovaski Chan - Has a crush on Juliet
Raymond Fung as Principle - Have a bad breath
Elisa Chan as Pik's wife - Sold Put chai ko for a living
Ching Tien as Pik's Father
Clifton Ko as Bus passenger (cameo)

Release
Happy Ghost was a hit for Cinema City and grossed a total of HK$17,414,334. The movie ran in theaters from 14 July 1984 to 3 August 1984. In the Philippines, the film was released by South Cinema Films as Magic to Win 3: The Origin on 12 January 1989, after Happy Ghost II and III (respectively released as Magic to Win and Magic to Win 2). In the Malaysia, the film was launched on TV3 called as Cinema programme slot aired on Friday, 18 November 2022 at 10pm until 11:59pm MST in Cantonese dubbed and Malay subtitle.

Reception
In his book Horror and Science Fiction Film IV, Donald C. Willis stated that Happy Ghost was "fairly elaborate and inventive, but tends to run off in all directions".

See also
Clifton Ko filmography
List of Hong Kong films of 1984

References

Notes

External links

 Happy Ghost at filmaffinity.com

1984 comedy films
1984 films
1980s Cantonese-language films
Chinese New Year films
Hong Kong comedy films
Hong Kong ghost films
Films directed by Clifton Ko
1980s Hong Kong films